Toledo Municipal Airport  is a city-owned public-use airport located two nautical miles (3.7 km) east of the central business district of Toledo, a city in Tama County, Iowa, United States.

Facilities and aircraft 
It has one runway designated 17/35 with a turf surface measuring 1,850 by 100 feet (564 x 30 m). For the 12-month period ending July 30, 2008, the airport had 990 general aviation aircraft operations, an average of 82 per month.

References

External links 
 Aerial image as of 22 April 1994 from USGS The National Map
 Toledo Municipal (8C5) at Iowa DOT

Airports in Iowa
Transportation buildings and structures in Tama County, Iowa